The following are the national records in Olympic weightlifting in the Dominican Republic. Records are maintained in each weight class for the snatch lift, clean and jerk lift, and the total for both lifts by the Federación Dominicana de Pesas.

Current records

Men

Women

Historical records

Women (1998–2018)

References

External links
 Federación Dominicana de Pesas

Dominican Republic
records
Olympic weightlifting
weightlifting